The Telejenel is a left tributary of the river Teleajen in Romania. It discharges into the Teleajen near Măneciu-Ungureni. The upper reach of the river is also known as Valea Stânei.

References

Rivers of Romania
Rivers of Prahova County